Anton Gennadyevich Sekret (born 23 January  1992) is a Russian former professional football player.

Club career
He made his debut in the Russian Premier League on 31 March 2012 for FC Kuban Krasnodar in a game against PFC CSKA Moscow and scored a late equalizer to bring his team a point in a 1–1 draw.

References

External links
 
 
 
 

1992 births
People from Bryukhovetsky District
Living people
Russian footballers
Association football midfielders
Expatriate footballers in Belarus
Russian Premier League players
Crimean Premier League players
FC Kuban Krasnodar players
FC Volgar Astrakhan players
FC Torpedo-BelAZ Zhodino players
FC SKA Rostov-on-Don players
FC Okean Kerch players
Sportspeople from Krasnodar Krai